So This Is College is a 1929 American pre-Code comedy film directed by Sam Wood, written by Al Boasberg, Delmer Daves and Joseph Farnham, and starring Elliott Nugent, Robert Montgomery in his film debut, Cliff Edwards, Sally Starr and Phyllis Crane. It was released on November 8, 1929 by Metro-Goldwyn-Mayer.

Plot
Biff and Eddie, two college classmates at the University of Southern California, are life-long friends, fraternity brothers, and members of the football team. Although they make a vow at the beginning of their senior year that they will no longer allow their pursuit of girls to get into the way of their friendship, they soon break their vow when both fall for pretty Babs Baxter, a popular co-ed. Vying for her affections, Biff and Eddie play pranks on each other that soon causes a serious breach in their relationship. When Eddie finally realizes that Biff wants to marry Babs, he decides to step aside for the sake of their friendship, but at the season's big football game, both realize that Babs has merely been toying with them she introduces them to her fiancé Bruce. After winning the game, Biff and Eddie decide never again to let girls come between them—until they see another pretty girl in the park.

Cast
Elliott Nugent as Eddie
Robert Montgomery as Biff
Cliff Edwards as Windy
Sally Starr as Babs
Phyllis Crane as Betty
Max Davidson as Moe
Ann Brody as Momma
Oscar Rudolph as Freshie
Polly Moran as Polly
Lee Shumway as Coach
Joel McCrea as Bruce Nolan (uncredited)

See also
 List of American football films

References

External links 
 
 

1929 films
1929 comedy films
American black-and-white films
American comedy films
American football films
1920s English-language films
Films directed by Sam Wood
Films set in California
Films set in universities and colleges
Metro-Goldwyn-Mayer films
1920s American films